Alexander Robinson (1901–1995) was a boxer, Ulster loyalist paramilitary and Ulster Special Constabulary reservist.

Alexander or Alex Robinson may also refer to:

Sportspeople
 Alex Robinson (footballer) (1886–1967), Australian rules footballer and cricketer
 Alexander Robinson (cricketer, born 1924) (1924–2012), Australian cricketer
 Alexander Robinson (Liberian footballer) (born 1985), Liberian football attacking midfielder
 Alexander Robinson (Costa Rican footballer) (born 1988), Costa Rican football centre-back
 Zander Robinson (born 1989), Canadian football player
 Alex Robinson (basketball) (born 1995), American basketball player

Other people
 Alex Robinson (born 1969), American comic book writer and artist
 Alex J. Robinson (born 1985), country music singer/songwriter
 Alexander Robinson (chief) (1789–1872), British-Ottawa chief and fur trader who helped found Chicago
 Alexander Robinson (Medal of Honor) (1831–?), United States Navy sailor and Medal of Honor recipient